The Stade Abbé-Deschamps is the home of AJ Auxerre football club in Auxerre, France. It has a capacity of 18,541. Renovated in 1994, it was renamed the Stade Abbé-Deschamps after the abbot Ernest-Théodore Deschamps, who founded the club in 1905.

Events

Association football

Gallery

References

External links

Football venues in France
AJ Auxerre
Sports venues in Yonne
Sports venues completed in 1905
1905 establishments in France